I Love You is a 1981 Brazilian drama film directed by Arnaldo Jabor. It was shot along the Rodrigo de Freitas Lagoon, Lagoa, Rio de Janeiro. It was screened in the Un Certain Regard section at the 1981 Cannes Film Festival.

Plot
Maria (Braga) and Paulo (Pereio) are a couple who use each other to satisfy their sexual desires and to avoid their loneliness. However, they are not at all in love. Over time as their relationship continues, Maria and Paulo begin to realize that they are in fact falling for each other.

Cast
 Sônia Braga as Maria
 Paulo César Pereio as Paulo
 Vera Fischer as Barbara Bergman 
 Tarcísio Meira as Ulisses
 Regina Casé
 Maria Lúcia Dahl
 Maria Sílvia

Awards and nominations
Festival de Gramado
Won, "Best Actress" - Sônia Braga
Won, "Best Cinematography" - Murilo Salles
Won, "Best Production Design" - Marcos Weinstock
Won, "Best Sound"
Nominated, "Best Film" - Arnaldo Jabor

São Paulo Association of Art Critics Awards
Won, "Best Cinematography" - Murilo Salles
Won, "Best Director" - Arnaldo Jabor

References

External links

 

1981 films
1981 romantic drama films
1980s erotic drama films
1980s Portuguese-language films
Atlantic Entertainment Group films
Brazilian romantic drama films
Brazilian erotic drama films
Films directed by Arnaldo Jabor
Films shot in Rio de Janeiro (city)